Armin Scholz is a German professional bodybuilder and gym owner.

Scholz was born in Leipzig, German Democratic Republic, in 1976, to Joachim and Monika Scholz. Armin has two siblings: sister Gabriela and brother Martin.

In 1982-1990 Armin attended school and in 1990-1994 a 'Sportgymnasium'. In 1992 Scholz started training as a bodybuilder. In 1994-1995 and 1997-2001 he was a student at the Sports Department of the Leipzig University.

Competitive stats

Height: 1' 88" (m)
Competitive weight:
 chest "
 arms  "
 waist "
 thigh "
 calf  "

Competitive history
1993 Sachsenmeisterschaft, 1st and Overall
1994 Sachsenmeisterschaft, 1st and Overall
1995 Badenwurthembergische Mesiterschaft, 1 and Overall
1995 Sachsenmeisterschaft, 1st and Overall
1995 Deutsche Mesiterschaft, 1st and Overall
1996 Junior –WM-Quali, 1st
1998 Sachsenmeisterschaft, 1st and Overall
1998 Deutsche Meisterschaft, 1st
1999 WM-Quali Men's, Best Men's IV Athlete
2002 Thuringenmeitershaft, 2nd
2002 Deutsche Meisterschaft, 1st
2005 Europa Pro-GP, 10th
2005 Charlotte Pro-GP, 11th
2005 Mr Olympia Wildcard, 6th
2006 Ironman-Pro, 10th
2006 San Francisco Pro-GP, 8th
2007 Santa Susanna Pro-GP, 4th
2008 Atlantic City Pro, 16th
2008 Ironman Pro, 17th
2008 Houston Pro, 4th

See also 

 List of German bodybuilders
 List of male professional bodybuilders
 Ofer Samra

External links 
 
 

German bodybuilders
Living people
Professional bodybuilders
1976 births